Catherine Douglas, later Catherine "Kate" Barlass, was a historical figure who tried to prevent the assassination of King James I (of Scotland) on the 20th of February, 1437. She was a lady-in-waiting to the Queen of Scotland, Joan Beaufort.

She was a member of the powerful Clan Douglas. Her mother was a daughter of David Lindsay, 1st Earl of Crawford and his wife Elizabeth Stewart daughter of Robert II, making her granddaughter of the King (Robert II of Scotland).

Legend has it that during the King's stay at a Dominican chapter house in Perth, a group of men led by Sir Robert Graham came to the door searching for the King in order to kill him. The King's Chamberlain, Robert Stewart, Master of Atholl, had removed the bolt from the door of the room in which James and his queen were staying.

James fled into a sewer tunnel as the queen and her ladies quickly replaced the floorboards to hide his location. Catherine sprang to the door and placed her arm through the staples to bar the assassins' entrance.  However, they forced the door open anyway, breaking Catherine's arm, and discovered and killed the King. From that point on, according to the story, Catherine took the surname of "Barlass".

The idiomatic phrase "Katie, bar the door!" (a warning of the approaching trouble) may have its origins in the story of Catherine Douglas. Dante Gabriel Rossetti recounted the story of Catherine Douglas in verse in 1881, under the title "The King's Tragedy". This poem contains the line "Catherine, keep the door!"

References

Notes
 Marshall, Rosalind (2003) Scottish Queens, 1034–1714. Tuckwell Press.
 Rossetti, Dante Gabriel, The King's Tragedy: James I of Scots—20 February, 1437 (The "Catherine, keep the door" action begins at line 546.).

Year of birth missing
Year of death missing
Catherine Douglas
15th-century Scottish women